Paul Garfield Smith (December 15, 1882 – September 1971) was an American football and baseball coach from Harrisburg, Pennsylvania.  He served as the head football coach for Bucknell University in 1908 and at Dickinson College in 1909, compiling a career college football record of 6–9–3.  Smith was also the head baseball coach at Bucknell in 1908, tallying a mark of 10–8. In the 1918 and 1919 high school football seasons, he coached Harrisburg Technical High School to 21 undefeated wins. He later worked as an attorney and judge, at one point serving as the president judge of the Dauphin County Court.

Head coaching record

Football

References

1882 births
1971 deaths
Bucknell Bison baseball coaches
Bucknell Bison football coaches
Dickinson Red Devils football coaches
Bucknell University alumni
Sportspeople from Harrisburg, Pennsylvania